The sprinkler strategy (also known as sprinkler diffusion strategy) is a market entry strategy based on the principle of diversification in which a company attempts to enter as many markets as possible in a relatively short time. 

A successful implementation of the sprinkler strategy requires a high standardization of marketing activities due to the extreme difficulty implied in the simultaneous maximization of marketing activities' customization and of the number of successful market entries. Usually, a certain amount of failed market entries and withdrawals from some markets is accepted if a sprinkler strategy is used. In case a waterfall strategy and a sprinkler strategy are used together, this yields a combined waterfall-sprinkler-strategy.

Advantages and disadvantages 

Advantages of the sprinkler strategy are:
 Once a market is successfully entered, its market entry barriers work against potential followers (first-mover advantages).
 The risk associated with multiple simultaneous market entry attempts is distributed regionally (risk diversification).
 Entering multiple markets simultaneously is likely to result in a high volume of sales which is beneficial with respect to capacity utilization.
 By achieving market entry in multiple markets the company makes full use of its competitive advantage.
 Multiple simultaneous market entries in foreign markets allow for a more rapid development of international markets.

Disadvantages of the sprinkler strategy are:
 A successful implementation of the sprinkler strategy incurs a high need for many financial and personnel resources in a very short time frame.
 If too many market entries are unsuccessful and the strategy fails, major losses to the company are highly probable.
 There is less or no opportunity to learn from earlier market entries and apply the lessons learned when making later market entries.

References

Sources

 Kuester, Sabine (2012): MKT 401: Strategic Marketing & Marketing in Specific Industry Contexts, University of Mannheim.

Business terms